Tracker Fund of Hong Kong or TraHK is a unit trust which provides investment results that correspond to the performance of the Hang Seng Index in the Hong Kong stock market.

History 
In 1998, the Hong Kong SAR Government acquired a substantial portfolio of Hong Kong shares to sustain linked exchange rate during the Asian Financial Crisis. To minimise disruption to the market, the Government chose to launch the IPO of the exchange-traded fund, "the Tracker Fund of Hong Kong", in 1999 as the first step in its disposal programme.

In August 1998, the Hong Kong Government acquired a substantial portfolio of Hong Kong shares during a market operation. The Exchange Fund Investment Limited (EFIL) was established in October 1998 by the Government to advise on the disposal of this portfolio in an orderly manner.

When seeking to dispose of these shares, the Government chose a stock neutral solution that would create minimal disruption to the market. An Exchange Traded Fund, the Tracker Fund of Hong Kong (TraHK), which met these requirements and added depth to Hong Kong's capital markets, was launched in November 1999 as the first step in the Government's disposal programme. State Street Global Advisors Asia Ltd was appointed as the Fund Manager and State Street Bank and Trust Company was appointed as the Trustee of TraHK. These appointments provided the Tracker Fund with a comprehensive solution to its needs, including portfolio management, custody, fund administration and compliance monitoring functions.

With an issue size of HK$33.3 billion (approximately US$4.3 billion), TraHK's initial public offering (IPO) was the largest IPO ever in Asia except Japan at the time of launch. Since the IPO, approximately HK$140.4 billion (by 15 October 2002) in Hang Seng Index constituent stocks has been returned to the market through TraHK's unique tap mechanism.

References

Companies listed on the Hong Kong Stock Exchange
Exchange-traded funds
Hang Seng Index
Financial services companies established in 1999
1999 establishments in Hong Kong